A live action role-playing game (LARP) is a form of role-playing game where the participants physically portray their characters. The players pursue goals within a fictional setting represented by real-world environments while interacting with each other in character. The outcome of player actions may be mediated by game rules or determined by consensus among players. Event arrangers called gamemasters decide the setting and rules to be used and facilitate play.

The first LARPs were run in the late 1970s, inspired by tabletop role-playing games and genre fiction. The activity spread internationally during the 1980s and has diversified into a wide variety of styles. Play may be very game-like or may be more concerned with dramatic or artistic expression. Events can also be designed to achieve educational or political goals. The fictional genres used vary greatly, from realistic modern or historical settings to fantastic or futuristic eras. Production values are sometimes minimal, but can involve elaborate venues and costumes. LARPs range in size from small private events lasting a few hours, to large public events with thousands of players lasting for days.

Terminology
LARP has also been referred to as live role-playing (LRP), interactive literature, and free form role-playing. Some of these terms are still in common use; however, LARP has become the most commonly accepted term. It is sometimes written in lowercase, as larp. The live action in LARP is analogous to the term live action used in film and video to differentiate works with human actors from animation. Playing a LARP is often called larping, and one who does it is a larper.

Play overview
The participants in a LARP physically portray characters in a fictional setting, improvising their characters' speech and movements somewhat like actors in improvisational theatre. This is distinct from tabletop role-playing games, where character actions are described verbally. LARPs may be played in a public or private area and may last for hours or days. There is usually no audience. Players may dress as their character and carry appropriate equipment, and the environment is sometimes decorated to resemble the setting. LARPs can be one-off events or a series of events in the same setting, and events can vary in size from a handful of players to several thousand.

Events are put on for the benefit of the players, who take on roles called player characters (PCs) that the players may create themselves or be given by the gamemasters. Players sometimes play the same character repeatedly at separate events, progressively developing the character and its relations with other characters and the setting.

Arrangers called gamemasters (GMs) determine the rules and setting of a LARP, and may also influence an event and act as referees while it is taking place. The GMs may also do the logistical work, or there may be other arrangers who handle details such as advertising the event, booking a venue, and financial management. Unlike the GM in a tabletop role-playing game, a LARP GM seldom has an overview of everything that is happening during play because numerous participants may be interacting at once. For this reason, a LARP GM's role is often less concerned with tightly maintaining a narrative or directly entertaining the players, and more with arranging the structure of the LARP before play begins and facilitating the players and crew to maintain the fictional environment during play.

Participants sometimes known as the crew may help the GMs to set up and maintain the environment of the LARP during play by acting as stagehands or playing non-player characters (NPCs) who fill out the setting. Crew typically receive more information about the setting and more direction from the GMs than players do. In a tabletop role-playing game, a GM usually plays all the NPCs, whereas in a LARP, each NPC is typically played by a separate crew member. Sometimes players are asked to play NPCs for periods of an event.

Much of play consists of interactions between characters. Some LARP scenarios primarily feature interaction between PCs. Other scenarios focus on interaction between PCs and aspects of the setting, including NPCs, that are under the direction of the GMs.

History

LARP does not have a single point of origin, but was invented independently by groups in North America, Europe, and Australia. These groups shared an experience with genre fiction or tabletop role-playing games, and a desire to physically experience such settings. In addition to tabletop role-playing, LARP is rooted in childhood games of make believe, play fighting, costume parties, roleplay simulations, Commedia dell'arte, improvisational theatre, psychodrama, military simulations, and historical reenactment groups such as the Society for Creative Anachronism.

The earliest recorded LARP group is Dagorhir, which was founded in 1977 in the United States and focuses on fantasy battles. Soon after the release of the movie Logan's Run in 1976, rudimentary live role-playing games based on the movie were run at US science fiction conventions. In 1981, the International Fantasy Gaming Society (IFGS) started, with rules influenced by Dungeons & Dragons. IFGS was named after a fictional group in the 1981 novel Dream Park, which described futuristic LARPs. In 1982, the Society for Interactive Literature, a predecessor of the Live Action Roleplayers Association (LARPA), formed as the first recorded theatre-style LARP group in the US.

Treasure Trap, formed in 1982 at Peckforton Castle, was the first recorded LARP game in the UK and influenced the fantasy LARPs that followed there. The first recorded LARP in Australia was run in 1983, using the science fiction Traveller setting. In 1993, White Wolf Publishing released Mind's Eye Theatre, which is still played internationally and is probably the most commercially successful published LARP. The first German events were in the early 1990s, with fantasy LARP in particular growing quickly there, so that since 2001, two major German events have been run annually that have between 3000 and 7000 players each and attract players from around Europe.

Today, LARP is a widespread activity internationally. Games with thousands of participants are run by for-profit companies, and a small industry exists to sell costume, armour and foam weapons intended primarily for LARP.

Purpose
Most LARPs are intended as games for entertainment. Enjoyable aspects can include the collaborative creation of a story, the attempt to overcome challenges in pursuit of a character's objectives, and a sense of immersion in a fictional setting. LARPs may also include other game-like aspects such as intellectual puzzles, and sport-like aspects such as fighting with simulated weapons.

Some LARPs stress artistic considerations such as dramatic interaction or challenging subject matter. Avant-garde or arthaus events have especially experimental approaches and high culture aspirations and are occasionally held in fine art contexts such as festivals or art museums. The themes of avant-garde events often include politics, culture, religion, sexuality and the human condition. Such LARPs are common in the Nordic countries but also present elsewhere.

In addition to entertainment and artistic merit, LARP events may be designed for educational or political purposes. For example, the Danish secondary school  uses LARP to teach most of its classes. Language classes can be taught by immersing students in a role-playing scenario in which they are forced to improvise speech or writing in the language they are learning. Politically-themed LARP events may attempt to awaken or shape political thinking within a culture.

Because LARP involves a controlled artificial environment within which people interact, it has sometimes been used as a research tool to test theories in social fields such as economics or law. For example, LARP has been used to study the application of game theory to the development of criminal law.

Fiction and reality

During a LARP, player actions in the real world represent character actions in an imaginary setting. Game rules, physical symbols and theatrical improvisation are used to bridge differences between the real world and the setting. For example, a rope could signify an imaginary wall. Realistic-looking weapon props and risky physical activity are sometimes discouraged or forbidden for safety reasons. While the fictional timeline in a tabletop RPG often progresses in game-time, which may be much faster or slower than the time passing for players, LARPs are different in that they usually run in real-time, with game-time only being used in special circumstances.

There is a distinction between when a player is in character, meaning they are actively representing their character, and when the player is out-of-character, meaning they are being themselves. Some LARPs encourage players to stay consistently in character except in emergencies, while others accept players being out-of-character at times. In a LARP, it is usually assumed that players are speaking and acting in character unless otherwise noted, which is the opposite of normal practice in tabletop role-playing games. Character knowledge is usually considered to be separate from player knowledge, and acting upon information a character would not know may be viewed as cheating.

While most LARPs maintain a clear distinction between the real world and the fictional setting, pervasive LARPs mingle fiction with modern reality in a fashion similar to alternate reality games. Bystanders who are unaware that a game is taking place may be treated as part of the fictional setting, and in-character materials may be incorporated into the real world.

Rules

Many LARPs have game rules that determine how characters can affect each other and the setting. The rules may be defined in a publication or created by the gamemasters. These rules may define characters' capabilities, what can be done with various objects that exist in the setting, and what characters can do during the downtime between LARP events. Because referees are often not available to mediate all character actions, players are relied upon to be honest in their application of the rules.

Some LARP rules call for the use of simulated weapons such as foam weapons or airsoft guns to determine whether characters succeed in hitting one another in combat situations. In Russian LARP events, weapons made of hard plastic, metal or wood are used. The alternative to using simulated weapons is to pause role-play and determine the outcome of an action symbolically, for example by rolling dice, playing rock paper scissors or comparing character attributes.

There are also LARPs that do without rules, instead relying on players to use their common sense or feel for dramatic appropriateness to cooperatively decide what the outcome of their actions will be.

Genres
LARPs can have any genre, although many use themes and settings derived from genre fiction. Some LARPs borrow a setting from an established work in another medium (e.g., The Lord of the Rings or the World of Darkness), while others use settings based on the real world or designed specifically for the LARP. Proprietary campaign settings, together with rulesets, are often the principal creative asset of LARP groups and LARP publishers.

LARPs set in the modern day may explore everyday concerns, or special interests such as espionage or military activity. Such LARPs sometimes resemble an Alternate Reality Game, an Assassin game, or a military simulation using live combat with airsoft, laser tag, or paintball markers. LARPs can also be set in historical eras or have semi-historical settings with mythological or fantastical aspects incorporated.

Fantasy is one of the most common LARP genres internationally and is the genre that the largest events use. Fantasy LARPs are set in pseudo-historical worlds inspired by fantasy literature and fantasy role-playing games such as Dungeons & Dragons. These settings typically have magic, fantasy races, and limited technology. Many fantasy LARPs focus on adventure or on conflict between character factions. In contrast, science fiction LARPs take place in futuristic settings with high technology and sometimes with extraterrestrial life. This describes a broad array of LARPs, including politically themed LARPs depicting dystopian or utopian societies and settings inspired by cyberpunk, space opera and post-apocalyptic fiction.

Horror LARPs are inspired by horror fiction. Popular subgenres include zombie apocalypse and Cthulhu Mythos, sometimes using the published Cthulhu Live rules. The World of Darkness, published by White Wolf Publishing, is a widely used goth–punk horror setting in which players usually portray secretive supernatural creatures such as vampires and werewolves. This setting can be played using Mind's Eye Theatre, which is a set of LARP rules also published by White Wolf. World of Darkness LARPs are usually played in a chronicle, a series of short events held at regular intervals, and are also popular at conventions. An international chronicle is run by White Wolf's official fan club, the Camarilla.

Styles

LARP events have a wide variety of styles that often overlap. Simple distinctions can be made regarding the genre used, the presence of simulated weapons or abstract rules, and whether players create their own characters or have them assigned by gamemasters. There is also a distinction between scenarios that are only run once and those that are designed to be repeatable. A number of other common classifications follow.

Theatre-style, or freeform, LARP is characterised by a focus on interaction between characters that are written by the gamemasters, not using simulated weapons for combat, and an eclectic approach to genre and setting. Events in this style typically only last a few hours and require relatively little preparation by players and are sometimes played at gaming conventions. Some murder mystery games where players are assigned characters and encouraged to roleplay freely also resemble theatre-style LARP.

Some very large events known as fests (short for festival) have hundreds or thousands of participants who are usually split into competing character factions camped separately around a large venue. There are only a few fests in the world, all based in Europe and Canada; however, their size means that they have a significant influence on local LARP culture and design. At the other end of the size scale, some small events known as linear or line-course LARPs feature a small group of PCs facing a series of challenges from NPCs and are often more tightly planned and controlled by GMs than other styles of LARP.

Nordic larp emphasises a collaborative "play to lose" strategy, keeping rules unobtrusive, and often explores emotionally complex issues. The Nordic Larp Wiki has extensive documentation of this style of playing, and of specific larps.  

While some LARPs are open to participants of all ages, others have a minimum age requirement. There are also youth LARPs, specifically intended for children and young people. Some are run through institutions such as schools, churches, or the Scouts. Denmark has an especially high number of youth LARPs.

Cultural significance
Roleplaying may be seen as part of a movement in Western culture towards participatory arts, as opposed to traditional spectator arts. Participants in a LARP cast off the role of passive observer and take on new roles that are often outside of their daily life and contrary to their culture. The arrangers of a LARP and the other participants act as co-creators of the game. This collaborative process of creating shared fictional worlds may be associated with a broader burgeoning "geek" culture in developed societies that is in turn associated with prolonged education, high uptake of information technology and increased leisure time. In comparison to the mainstream video-game industry, which is highly commercialized and often marketed towards a male audience, LARP is less commoditized, and women actively contribute as authors and participants.

LARP is not well known in most countries and is sometimes confused with other role-playing, reenactment, costuming, or dramatic activities. While fan and gamer culture in general has become increasingly mainstream in developed countries, LARP has often not achieved the same degree of cultural acceptability. This may be due to intolerance of the resemblance to childhood games of pretend, a perceived risk of over-identification with the characters, and the absence of mass marketing. In US films such as the 2006 documentary Darkon, the 2007 documentary Monster Camp, and the 2008 comedy Role Models, fantasy LARP is depicted as somewhat ridiculous and escapist, but also treated affectionately as a "constructive social outlet". In the Nordic countries, LARP has achieved a high level of public recognition and popularity. It is often shown in a positive light in mainstream media, with an emphasis on the dramatic and creative aspects. However, even in Norway, where LARP has greater recognition than in most other countries, it has still not achieved full recognition as a cultural activity by government bodies.

Communities have formed around the creation, play and discussion of LARP. These communities have developed a subculture that crosses over with role-playing, fan, reenactment, and drama subcultures. Early LARP subculture focused on Tolkien-like fantasy, but it later broadened to include appreciation of other genres, especially the horror genre with the rapid uptake of the World of Darkness setting in the 1990s. Like many subcultures, LARP groups often have a common context of shared experience, language, humour, and clothing that can be regarded by some as a lifestyle.

LARP has been a subject of academic research and theory. Much of this research originates from role-players, especially from the publications of the Nordic Knutepunkt role-playing conventions. The broader academic community has recently begun to study LARP as well, both to compare it to other media and other varieties of interactive gaming, and also to evaluate it in its own right. In 2010, William Bainbridge speculated that LARP may one day evolve into a major industry in the form of location-based games using ubiquitous computing.

In Denmark, Østerskov Efterskole uses LARP as an educational method of teaching subjects to high school boarding students through interactivity and simulation. LARP groups are also using simulations of current and historical events and topics like refugees and the AIDS crisis to roleplay and explore these subjects.

Script murder games 
In China, script murder games are murder mystery LARP games. Typically, script murder games can be experienced in a tabletop game format or a format which combines larping and escape rooms. Players are given different script options and are assigned characters to play through the murder mystery; these games often occur at dedicated gaming stores where players pay to participate. In September 2020, the Agence France-Presse reported that "the live action murder mystery market appears to have captured the imagination of China's urban youth before the Covid-19 pandemic emerged this year. [...] A report on China National Radio last month voiced fears that too many of the scripts relied on murders, violent plots and sexual content, but others see the games as a way to get young people off their smartphones and back interacting with each other in real life".

In October 2021, the South China Morning Post reported that "advertisements for script-killing are prominent in China. [...] The fact that it is a new industry is precisely the problem in the eyes of the authorities. Since the Covid-19 case that brought 'script-killing' to national attention, the game has been getting mainstream traction, inviting official concerns and possible future regulations". In October 2022, Polygon commented that Chinese "regulators are beginning to take notice of the genre's mature content. A story published Wednesday indicates that municipal and provincial authorities have now begun regulating content and demanding that some retailers remove certain materials from sale. [...] As a result, some store owners are now curating their selection to fall in line with government regulation".

See also
 Cosplay
 List of live action role-playing groups

References

Citations

General and cited references 

 
 
 

 
 
 
 
 
 
 
 
 

 
Combat sports
Nerd culture
Role-playing